Virginity is a 1937 Czechoslovak drama film directed by Otakar Vávra.

Cast
 Lída Baarová as Hana Poláčková
 Jaroslava Skorkovská as Hana's mother
 František Kreuzmann as Hana's stepfather
 Ladislav Boháč as Composer Pavel Jimeš
 Zdeněk Štěpánek as Bistro owner Josef Nevostrý
 Adina Mandlová as Shop assistant Lili
 Božena Šustrová as Shop assistant Mary
 Jaroslav Průcha as Lay judge Rudolf Res
 Vítězslav Boček as Poet Hejtmánek
 Anna Steimarová Old singer
 Marie Ježková as Dishwasher Barča
 František Filipovský as Waiter Jenda

Production
The film was originally directed by Josef Rovenský, who died after two days of shooting. Vávra re-wrote the screenplay and re-cast some roles. Rolf Wanka was originally cast as Jimeš and Darja Hajská was cast as Barča.

References

External links
 

1937 films
1937 drama films
1930s Czech-language films
Czechoslovak black-and-white films
Czechoslovak drama films
Films directed by Otakar Vávra
1930s Czech films